Tired Hooker is third home video release and the fourteenth Bravo stand-up comedy special by stand-up comedian Kathy Griffin and sixteenth overall. It was released simultaneously with Pants Off.

Track listing

Personnel

Technical and production
Andy Cohen - executive producer (as Andrew Cohen)
Kathy Griffin - executive producer
Jenn Levy - executive producer
Paul Miller - executive producer
Kimber Rickabaugh - executive producer
Jeff U'ren - film editor
Bruce Ryan - production design
Cisco Henson - executive in charge of production
Lesley Maynard - production supervisor
Gene Crowe - associate director
Alan Adelman - lighting designer
David Crivelli - technical supervisor
Gene Crowe - stage manager
Danielle Iacovelli - production assistant (uncredited)

Visuals and imagery
Ashlee Mullen - hair stylist / makeup artist
Erica Courtney - jewelry

References

External links
Kathy Griffin's Official Website
 

Kathy Griffin albums
Stand-up comedy albums
2011 live albums